Potton Island is a sparsely populated island west of Foulness in Essex, England. It is connected to the mainland by a swing bridge with a traffic light system, and the road leads to Great Wakering.

Unlike some of the other nearby islands which were formerly marshland, Potton Island has been inhabited at least since the Neolithic era.  It was home to several arable farms until it flooded in 1884, leading to its temporary abandonment and longer-term use as pasture.  The island was reclaimed in the 1940s but some time after being acquired by the Ministry of Defence in 1955 it reverted to pasture. In June 2005, it was disclosed that Potton Island was considered by John Major's Conservative government in the 1980s or 1990s as a potential long-term storage site for high-level nuclear waste. Local government (Southend-on-Sea Borough Council) subsequently expressed their surprise and concern that they had not been party to any consultation on the matter.

External links

Islands of Essex
Rochford District